Shuja al-Khwarazmi also known as Umm Jaʽfar or Umm al-Mutawakkil was the Umm walad of eighth Abbasid caliph al-Mu'tasim and mother of al-Mutawakkil.

Shuja was the concubine of Abbasid prince Muhammad. She entered the Harem probably in 819/820. She was raised in the Abbasid household before Abbasid prince Abu Ishaq Muhammad ibn Harun kept her as a concubine. She was related to Musa ibn Bugha the Elder. The meaning of her name was Brave and Courageous. She gave birth to Muhammad's son Jafar (future Al-Mutawakkil).
 
Al-Mutawakkil was born on February/March 822 to the Abbasid prince Abu Ishaq Muhammad (the future al-Mu'tasim) his concubine from Khwarazm called Shuja.
 
The Early life of Shuja is unclear because the Early life of Al-Mutawakkil is obscure, as he played no role in political affairs until the death of his older half-brother, al-Wathiq, in August 847. When her son became Caliph, he gave his mother Shuja, a degree of financial power to the extent that she had about 500,000 dinar and several pieces of land; however, there is no mention in sources that she had any political power. Shortly after her son became Caliph Shuja decided to perform hajj.

Shuja was generous, when she went on the pilgrimage, Al-Mutawakkil accompanied her to bid her goodbye. When she reached Kufa she ordered that each of the Abbasid (descendants of Abbas) and the Talibid men (descendants of Abu Talib) were to receive one thousand dinars while every women was to receive five hundred dinars, while every men from Al-Muhajirin was to receive a hundred dinars, while every women was to receive ten dinars. She left behind fifty thousand dinars and more than a million dinar worth jewelry.

Shuja died in June-July 861. Her wealth was inherited by her grandchildren.

Family
Shuja was related to several important Abbasid caliphs and princes:

References

Source
 
 El-Azhari Taef El-Azhari, Shuja, p. 100". Queens, Eunuchs and Concubines in Islamic History, 661–1257. El-Azhari Taef El-Azhari
 The rules about women. Jamal Al-Din Abi Al-Faraj Abdul Rahman. 2013

861 deaths
Medieval slaves
Concubines of the Abbasid caliphs
9th-century women from the Abbasid Caliphate
9th-century people from the Abbasid Caliphate
Mothers of Abbasid caliphs